The  of the Ministry of the Navy of Japan was responsible for the development and training of the Imperial Japanese Navy Air Service. In 1941 it was headed by Vice-Admiral Eikichi Katagiri and was organized as follows:
 General Affairs Department
 Air Naval Intelligence Department
 Land Based Airfield Engineering Department
 Training Department - ensured that qualified personnel were sent to the Combined Air Training Command at Kasumigara.
 Technical Department - Designed new aircraft and equipment plus was responsible for the storage and repair of aircraft at Naval Air Arsenals
Aomori
Koza
 Hiro
 Omura or Sasebo
Kanoya
Kasumigara
Yokosuka

Navy Training Schools and Units 
Training for the IJNAS are conducted under training unit led directly by the Naval Air Bureau. Such unit could either be an actual combat air group(Kōkūtai) or a proper training unit. For training pilot for carrier operation, light carriers are employed.

Such schools and units was named after the place where they were established (cities, towns or Arsenal/Base), or with the carrier name if it is a carrier based unit. A numbering system is also used.

For example, the 12th combined air group(training) based at Kure consist of the Ōita, Usa, Hakata and Ōmura training air group.

Navy training units by name
Oppama
Chitose
Genzan
Tainan
Tokushima
Konoike
Ōita
Ōmura
Tsukuba
Yokosuka
Hyakuri
Kasumigaura
Tsuikui
 Kuiko
Shanghai
Suzuka
Tsuchiura
 Kaminoike

Training Carriers
 Hōshō
 Ryūhō

See also
 List of Imperial Japanese Navy Air Force Service personnel (WWII)
 Organization of the Imperial Japanese Navy Air Service

References 

Imperial Japanese Navy Air Service
Imperial Japanese Navy
Units of the Imperial Japanese Navy Air Service